Jaromír Dragan (born 14 September 1963) is a Slovak former professional ice hockey goaltender.

Dragan spent the majority of his career with HC Košice, initially in the Czechoslovak Extraliga before following the team to the Slovak Extraliga after the dissolution of Czechoslovakia. He also played for HC Slovan Bratislava and HC Zlín.

Dragan was a member Czechoslovakian national team at the 1992 Winter Olympics though he did not play a game during the tournament. He also competed in the 1994 Winter Olympics for Slovakia.

He lives in Košice at Sídlisko Ťahanovce.

References

External links
 

1963 births
Living people
Czechoslovak ice hockey goaltenders
HC Košice players
HC Slovan Bratislava players
PSG Berani Zlín players
Ice hockey players at the 1994 Winter Olympics
Olympic ice hockey players of Slovakia
Sportspeople from Liptovský Mikuláš
Slovak ice hockey goaltenders
Slovak expatriate ice hockey players in the Czech Republic